Antsoha is a municipality in Madagascar. It belongs to the district of Ihosy, which is a part of Ihorombe Region. The population of the commune was 4,676 in 2018.

Geography
It is situated at 60 km north of the regions capital Ihosy by the National road 7, followed by 61 km of an unpaved road. The municipality is crossed by the Manatara river.

Education
98% of the population are analphabets.  A school exists only since 2006 inside the town hall.

References

Populated places in Ihorombe